Mięguszowiecki Szczyt Wielki or the Mięguszowiecki Grand Peak is a mountain in the Tatra Mountains, Poland, located on the Slovak-Polish border.

It is the highest of the three Mięguszowiecki Summits and the second-highest mountain in Poland after Rysy (2,499 meters, the highest peak in the Polish Tatras).

Gallery

Two-thousanders of Poland
Two-thousanders of Slovakia
Mountains of the Western Carpathians